Jion (1351–1409) was a monk during the Nanboku-chō period (14th century) of Japan. His full name was Nenami Okuyama Jion (he was born Sōma Shiro Yoshimoto, but adopted the Buddhist name Jion later in life). Jion was the founder of the Nen ryu fighting style, famous for the simple saying "Strike with the left arm extended". During Jion's life, he trained fourteen disciples. Tsutsumi Hozan his 12th, was trained with the jitte fighting style and is said to have ripped off another disciples' jaw. Jion was strict about who would be the sharer of his teachings. Jion devised a system in which only one disciple could share the knowledge per fief. This was to make sure that Jion's influence would spread widely. Jion's fourteen disciples shared his teachings to fourteen different regions. Due to this, many famous swordsmen such as Kamiizumi Nobutsuna and Yagyu Muneyoshi learned Jion's teachings. Even the famous Miyamoto Musashi is said to have followed some of Jion's fighting principles.

References

Famous Japanese Swordsmen of the Two Courts Period - Willam de Lange

Miyamoto Musashi - Life and Writings

Jion (monk)
Jion (monk)
Jion (monk)